Louis Bennett is an English-American soccer coach who played professionally in the American Indoor Soccer Association.  He is currently the head coach at Marquette University.

Player
In 1984, Bennett signed with the Milwaukee Wave of the American Indoor Soccer Association.  He played three seasons with the Wave.
Also played with the Dayton Dynamo & Memphis Rogues

Coach

University of Wisconsin-Milwaukee
He served as the head men's soccer coach at the University of Wisconsin–Milwaukee from 1996 to 2005. He led the Panthers to a 136–63–17 record during his tenure. He led UW-Milwaukee to five straight NCAA tournament appearances, including 4 straight in which the team made the second round. His team absolutely dominated the Horizon League, posting a 41–4–2 record with 5 conference titles since 2001.

The Panthers also went 14–1 in the Horizon tournament, and won 4 tournament crowns during that span. His 2002 team went 19–2–1, and set the school record with a high national ranking of 8. For his effort, he was named Horizon League Coach of the year that season. He won five Horizon League Coach of the Year awards during his stay with the Panthers.

He had previously served as an assistant coach with the UW-Milwaukee program from 1993–1995.

Marquette University
He is currently the head men's soccer coach at Marquette University, a position he has held since 2006. He has compiled a 10–48–12 record in his four years there. Despite his record, his teams have shown improvement each year, increasing their number of wins. As of 2006 his overall coaching record stands at 146–111–29.

His tenure is greatly supported by his assistant coaches' recruiting efforts bringing in multiple classes of stellar student athletes that have won the program two Big East titles.

References

External links
 Marquette Golden Eagles bio

American Indoor Soccer Association players
Marquette Golden Eagles men's soccer coaches
Milwaukee Wave players
Milwaukee Panthers men's soccer coaches
Living people
Year of birth missing (living people)
American soccer coaches
English expatriate football managers
English expatriate footballers
English expatriate sportspeople in the United States
Expatriate soccer players in the United States
Expatriate soccer managers in the United States
Alumni of Manchester Metropolitan University
Association footballers not categorized by position
Association football players not categorized by nationality